Naptumomab estafenatox (ABR-217620) is a drug being developed for the treatment of various types of cancer like non-small cell lung carcinoma and renal cell carcinoma.

Mechanism of action
Chemically, it is a fusion protein consisting of the antigen-binding fragment (Fab) of a monoclonal antibody with the superantigen staphylococcal enterotoxin A (SEA/E-120, "estafenatox"). The Fab binds to 5T4, an antigen expressed by various tumor cells, and the superantigen induces an immune response by activating T lymphocytes.

See also 
 Nacolomab tafenatox, a drug with a similar chemical structure and mechanism

References 

Monoclonal antibodies for tumors
Antibody-drug conjugates